Prymnesin-1 is a chemical with the molecular formula . It is a member of the prymnesins, a class of hemolytic phycotoxins made by the alga Prymnesium parvum. It is known to be toxic to fish, causing mass fish deaths around the world, including in Texas and England, or in 2022 in the border region of Germany and Poland (Oder).

Structures 
Prymnesin-1 is formed of a large polyether polycyclic core with several conjugate double and triple bonds, chlorine and nitrogen heteroatoms and O-linked sugar moieties including α-D-ribofuranose, α-L-arabinopyranose, and β-D-galactofuranose, unlike the single linked α-L-xylofuranose of prymnesin-2.  There are three forms of prymnesin known, prymnesin 1 and 2, differing in their glycosylation, and prymnesin B1 differing in backbone.

See also
 Prymnesin-2
 Prymnesin-B1

References 

Phycotoxins
Polyether toxins
Primary alcohols
Secondary alcohols
Conjugated enynes
Organochlorides
Halohydrins
Halogen-containing natural products
Amines
Conjugated diynes
Glycosides